A visiting judge is a judge appointed to hear a case as a member of a court to which he or she does not ordinarily belong.

In many United States Courts of Appeals it is not uncommon for a district judge to sit on a panel as a visiting judge; less frequently it is a judge from another circuit (in active service or, more commonly, in senior status). Retired Supreme Court justices have done the same, including Justices Sandra Day O'Connor and David Souter, and very unusually, sitting justices (in 1984, for example, Justice William Rehnquist served as a visiting judge for a jury trial in the United States District Court for the Eastern District of Virginia). This is sometimes done to ease caseload pressures, and sometimes (as in Rehnquist's case) for experience. In other cases, notably those of some judges in senior status, the individual may sit in a different court for personal reasons (such as sitting in areas popular with retirees such as Florida or in a person's hometown).

References

External links
 

Judges